The 2015 Rio Open was a professional tennis tournament played on outdoor clay courts. It was the 2nd edition of the tournament, and part of the 2015 ATP World Tour and the 2015 WTA Tour. It took place in Rio de Janeiro, Brazil between 16 February and 22 February 2015.

Points and prize money

Point distribution

Prize money 

1 Qualifiers prize money is also the Round of 32 prize money
* per team

ATP singles main-draw entrants

Seeds 

 1 Rankings as of February 9, 2015.

Other entrants 
The following players received wildcards into the main draw:
  Guilherme Clezar
  João Souza
  Elias Ymer

The following players received entry from the qualifying draw:
  Facundo Argüello
  Marco Cecchinato
  Thiemo de Bakker
  Daniel Gimeno Traver

Withdrawals 
Before the tournament
  Marcel Granollers → replaced by  Albert Montañés

Retirements 
  Thiemo de Bakker (stomach pain)
  Santiago Giraldo (dehydration)
  Leonardo Mayer (dehydration)
  Diego Schwartzman (cramping)

ATP doubles main-draw entrants

Seeds 

 1 Rankings as of February 9, 2015.

Other entrants 
The following pairs received wildcards into the main draw:
  Fabiano de Paula /  Marcelo Demoliner
  André Sá /  João Souza

Withdrawals
During the tournament
  David Marrero (illness)

WTA singles main-draw entrants

Seeds 

 1 Rankings as of February 9, 2015

Other entrants 
The following players received wildcards into the main draw:
  Gabriela Cé
  Paula Cristina Gonçalves
  Beatriz Haddad Maia

The following players received entry from the qualifying draw:
  Ana Bogdan
  Estrella Cabeza Candela
  Verónica Cepede Royg
  Montserrat González
  María Irigoyen
  Sara Sorribes Tormo

Withdrawals 
Before the tournament
 Jana Čepelová → replaced by  Andreea Mitu
 Sorana Cîrstea → replaced by  Olivia Rogowska
 Nicole Gibbs → replaced by  Paula Ormaechea
 Christina McHale → replaced by  Teliana Pereira
 Sílvia Soler Espinosa → replaced by  Lucie Hradecká

Retirements 
  Ana Bogdan (heat illness)
  Beatriz Haddad Maia (cramping)
  María Teresa Torró Flor (left thigh injury)

WTA doubles main-draw entrants

Seeds 

 1 Rankings as of February 9, 2015.

Other entrants 
The following pair received entry as alternates:
  Estrella Cabeza Candela /  Gaia Sanesi

Withdrawals 
Before the tournament
  María Teresa Torró Flor (left thigh injury)

During the tournament
  Beatriz Haddad Maia

Retirements 
  Irina-Camelia Begu (right rib injury)

Champions

Men's singles 

  David Ferrer def.  Fabio Fognini, 6–2, 6–3

Women's singles 

  Sara Errani def.  Anna Schmiedlová, 7–6(7–2), 6–1

Men's doubles 

  Martin Kližan /  Philipp Oswald def.  Pablo Andújar /  Oliver Marach, 7–6(7–3), 6–4

Women's doubles 

  Ysaline Bonaventure /  Rebecca Peterson def.  Irina-Camelia Begu /  María Irigoyen, 3–0, retired.

References

External links 
 Official website

Rio de Janeiro Open
Rio de Janeiro Open
2015
Rio